Calueque is a town next to a dam and pumping station of the same name on the Kunene River in the Kunene Province of southern Angola. This dam is one of the last landmarks along the Kunene River, prior to the Kunene becoming a border feature between Angola and Namibia. A  pipeline and canal extends across the border into Namibia, supplying towns as far away as Oshakati in Ovamboland with water. The dam was completed in 1976. However, due to the onset of the Angolan civil war following independence, the full master plan for the scheme was not realised by the South African and Portuguese governments.

Angolan Civil War
The area was of considerable strategic importance, providing the pretext for the initial 1975 South African military intervention in the Angolan Civil War when staff at the facility were threatened by guerrillas.  Full intervention through Operation Savannah followed shortly afterwards.

Throughout the Angolan Civil war Calueque remained continuously occupied by South African forces. In 1988, during the Battle of Cuito Cuanavale, the Cubans opened a second front against the South Africans and launched a massive ground offensive in the direction of Calueque. The area to the north of the dam became the scene of bloody fighting which proved to be a turning point in the war. On 27 June 1988, the South Africans retreated across the dam to South-West Africa and the same day Cuban MiG-23 fighters attacked the facilities.  The first wave of aircraft bombed the bridge and sluice gates, killing South African soldiers in the process.  Another wave bombed the pump and generator, while a third destroyed the pipeline to Ovamboland. Significantly, one of the last bombs hit the position of South African soldiers nearby who had exited their Buffel troop carrier to watch the events unfold.  The dam and pipelines were considerably damaged, rendering the scheme inoperable.

Whilst the Calueque Dam and bridge were neglected since the bombing of 1988, the Angolan Government in April 2012 signed a US$225million contract for the rehabilitation of the dam wall, the construction of two hydro plants, a new channel and 21 irrigation pivots. The project was awarded to  Mota-Engil and Lyon and is scheduled to take 25 months.

References

External links
Calueque Dam Bomb Damage
Ruacana Power Station page at Namibia Power official website

Dams in Angola
Populated places in Cunene Province
Angola–South Africa relations
Portugal–South Africa relations